Hanno ( Ḥɴʾ), distinguished as the son of Hannibal, was, according to Diodorus Siculus, a Carthaginian general during the First Punic War (264 to 241 BC).

Historiography 
Writing in the 1st century B.C., Diodorus Siculus, mentions Hanno in his account of the First Punic War and refers to him as “Hanno, son of Hannibal”, to distinguish him from other Carthaginians of that name.

Battle of Agrigentum

Before the battle, Hannibal Gisco was in the city of Agrigentum, besieged by the Romans, and Hanno was sent to provide relief. Hanno concentrated his troops at Heraclea Minoa and captured the Roman supply base at Herbesos. He told his Numidian cavalry to attack the Roman cavalry and then feign retreat. The Romans pursued the Numidians as they retreated and were brought to the main Carthaginian column where they suffered many losses. According to Polybius, the siege lasted several months before the Romans defeated the Carthaginians and forced Hanno to retreat.

See also
 Other Hannos in Carthaginian history

References

Citations

Bibliography
 . 

Carthaginian commanders of the First Punic War
3rd-century BC Punic people